The 2020–21 Bowling Green Falcons men's ice hockey season was the 52nd season of play for the program and the 8th in the WCHA conference. The Falcons represented Bowling Green State University and were coached by Ty Eigner, in his 2nd season.

Season
As a result of the ongoing COVID-19 pandemic the entire college ice hockey season was delayed. Because the NCAA had previously announced that all winter sports athletes would retain whatever eligibility they possessed through at least the following year, none of Bowling Green's players would lose a season of play. However, the NCAA also approved a change in its transfer regulations that would allow players to transfer and play immediately rather than having to sit out a season, as the rules previously required.

Despite COVID concerns, Bowling Green was able to play several non-WCHA teams early in the year and propelled themselves into the top-10 with a fantastic start. The Falcons won 12 of their first 13 games, including an impressive series sweep of Quinnipiac, and rose to the #5 ranking by mid-January. Unfortunately, when Bowling Green began facing stiff competition, the offense dropped off dramatically. Over a 4-week stretch, the Falcons went 2–6, losing the six games against teams that finished the season ranked. In those games the team scored just 6 goals. While the defense wasn't particularly bad, it wasn't good either. Bowling Green recovered with a 3–0–1 run to end the season but the damage had been done.

Even with a 19–8–1 record, the Falcons had fallen to 13th in the rankings and were considered a 'bubble team', since they possessed a 1–7 record against the other top teams in the WCHA. To get themselves an NCAA Tournament bid, the team would need a good performance in their conference tournament. BG got off to a bad start, losing the opening game 3–4 to Northern Michigan, but rebounded with resounding 5–0 win. The turnaround didn't last long, however, and the Falcons dropped the deciding game 1–5. The team was ranked 16th the following poll and were passed over in favor of Notre Dame, who were just 1 game over .500.

Departures

Recruiting

Roster
As of September 8, 2020.

Standings

Schedule and Results

|-
!colspan=12 style=";" | Regular Season

|-
!colspan=12 style=";" | 

|- align="center" bgcolor="#e0e0e0"
|colspan=12|Bowling Green Lost Series 1–2

Scoring statistics

Goaltending statistics

† Dop and Rich shared a shutout on February 24

Rankings

USCHO did not release a poll in week 20.

Awards and honors

References

Bowling Green Falcons men's ice hockey seasons
Bowling Green Falcons
Bowling Green Falcons
Bowling Green Falcons
Bowling Green Falcons
Bowling Green Falcons